Lukare is a village in Novi Pazar, Serbia. Its population is 489, with 452 Bosniaks.

Notable people
Tahir Efendi Jakova the Albanian.

Populated places in Raška District
Novi Pazar